Sarah Christophers (born 28 August 1986) is an Australian-born Filipino actress.

Biography

Christophers was launched by ABS-CBN via Star Magic Batch 8.  She first got her acting role in the family drama Ang Munting Paraiso.

In 2001, she made a crossover appearance to the ABS-CBN teen drama G-mik.  In the show she went to watch her school's basketball match against the school of Yuan Salcedo, played by John Prats.

In 2002, she played as Pamela Sue in the teen drama Berks after Munting Paraiso ended her three-year run.

She was cast as a reporter in the comedy news program Wazzup Wazzup.  The same year, she made a guest appearance in the stunt/dare reality game show Victim Overload.  During her episode appearance she announced that she is leaving for Australia to continue her high school studies.

In 2008, she was featured on the cover of the April issue of Uno Magazine.

Personal background

In high school, she was home schooled under Angelicum College Home Study Program.  In college, she took up Business Administration in the University of Santo Tomas. She took further studies in Perth, Australia.

Filmography

References

External links

Australian people of Filipino descent
Star Magic
Living people
1986 births
University of Santo Tomas alumni